Cyllin was a legendary, and possibly historical British king of the 1st century AD, early Christian saint and the last pendragon of Great Britain. His existence is based on very limited evidence. Richard Williams Morgan claimed that a reference to him as a son of Caratacus was found in the family records of Iestyn ab Gwrgant and used this as evidence of early entry of Christianity to Britain;

Reference to Cyllin is also given in Iolo Morganwg's "Third series" of forged Welsh Triads. He is also discussed in the works of Rice Rees, Jane Williams, Sabine Baring-Gould and John Williams (Ab Ithel) as brother of Saint Eigen and father of King Coel. He is also noted in a manuscript giving the genealogy of Taliesin from the collection of Thomas Hopkin of Coychurch along with one from the Havod Uchtryd collection where he is called Cynan, a name often associated with Conan Meriadoc.

References

External links
 

1st-century Christian martyrs
1st-century deaths
Briton rulers
1st-century monarchs in Europe
Arthurian characters
Britain
Welsh mythology
Year of birth unknown